The Order of Merit of the Bahamas is an order of merit of the Bahamas. Founded in 1996, the King acts as the order's sovereign, and the governor-general acts as Chancellor of the Order. The motto of the Order is 'rising above the clouds'.

Recipients 

 Durward Knowles
 Lynden Pindling

Bahamas and the Commonwealth of Nations
Orders, decorations, and medals of the Bahamas
Orders of merit
Awards established in 1996